Eva Ekeblad (née De la Gardie; 10 July 1724 – 15 May 1786) was a Swedish countess, salon hostess, agronomist, and scientist. She was widely known for discovering a method in 1746 to make alcohol and flour from potatoes, allowing greater use of scarce grains for food production, significantly reducing Sweden's incidence of famine.

Ekeblad was the first female member of the Royal Swedish Academy of Sciences (1748).

Life

Personal life
Eva Ekeblad was born in 1724, originally named Eva de la Gardie before her marriage to Count Claes Claesson Ekeblad at the young age of 16 (Barrett, 2022). Being born into the Swedish aristocracy, she had no obligation to a life of science, but due to her husbands travels she found herself taking care of their property (Barrett, 2022). Over time she became quite the agronomist, or a scientist of agriculture.

Her father was a state marshal of Sweden. She had 13 siblings, Eva being the 10th oldest of them all, but the second oldest to survive childhood (Lenneman & Grosjean). Her family was very involved in Swedish politics, often times holding events for the nobles of the state (Lenneman & Grosjean). Due to her bloodline and her marriage she was an extremely powerful influence throughout the country, but one would not know that through her actions (Lenneman & Grosjean).

Her and her husband had a grand total of 8 children, the last 7 of which were all daughters (Lenneman & Grosjean).

Scientific Discoveries
Eva Ekeblad was a master of agronomy, and in her young life she discovered many uses for the potato. In a time where food was not a stable commodity, she found a way to create alcohol and flour from the mighty potato (Barrett, 2022). Although she was not the first to do so, her method was far more efficient and advanced than the other out there. Sweden was at a point where famine was a serious threat, and any way for expand either the use or production of grains was increasingly sought after. Will all her work in agronomy, she decided to test her luck and figure out what the potato was capable of. She discovered that potato flour could be made after cooking, cutting and then drying. This flour was put to use in creating alcohol and bread, which helped Sweden avoid future famine by allowing other grains to be used for other purposes while supplies were low. There was a reported increase in alcohol consumption after her discover of potato alcohol.

Eva kept experimenting with the potato, finding a way to make soap that could clean cotton-wool, and created a make-up powder that did not use arsenic. She would wear potato flours in her hair as a tribute to the starch, and as a fun conversation starter (Herald, 2019).

Eva's work led to her being the first ever woman to be a member of the Royal Swedish Academy of Sciences. Her membership was later revoked because she was a woman in the 18th century (Herald, 2019).

Potato alcohol is still used today, although that as commonly as it was after her innovation (Distillery Trail, 2017).

Late Life
As her life went on, her status in the state of Sweden was amplified. She was close with the Queen and took on a political life of her own as she served on many courts as well as holding many different political positions such as Mistress of the Robes (Barrett, 2022). She would die at the age of 61.

References
Barrett, P. (2022, February 25). Eva Ekeblad (1724-1786). The Mills Archive. Retrieved April 28, 2022, from https://new.millsarchive.org/2020/07/22/eva-ekeblad-1724-1786/ 
Distillery Trail. (2017, July 10). Born This Day in 1724: Scientist Eva Ekeblad put an end to famine and gave the world potato vodka. Distillery Trail. Retrieved April 28, 2022, from https://www.distillerytrail.com/blog/born-day-1724-scientist-eva-ekeblad-put-end-famine-gave-world-potato-vodka/ 
Herald, M. (2019, September 24). Who was Eva Ekeblad? WorldAtlas. Retrieved April 28, 2022, from https://www.worldatlas.com/feature/who-was-eva-ekeblad.html 
Lenneman, E. (n.d.). Eva Ekeblad. Retrieved April 28, 2022, from https://skbl.se/en/article/EvaEkeblad

Scientific work
In 1746, Ekeblad wrote to the Royal Swedish Academy of Sciences on her discoveries of how to make flour and alcohol out of potatoes. Potatoes had been introduced into Sweden in 1658, but had been cultivated only in the greenhouses of the aristocracy. Ekeblad's work turned potatoes into a staple food in Sweden, and increased the supply of wheat, rye and barley available for making bread, since potatoes could be used instead to make alcohol. This greatly improved the country's eating habits and reduced the frequency of famines.

She also discovered a method of bleaching cotton textile and yarn with soap in 1751, and of replacing the dangerous ingredients in cosmetics of the time by using potato flour (1752); she is said to have advertised the plant by using its flowers as hair ornaments.

In 1748, Eva Ekeblad became the first woman elected to Royal Swedish Academy of Sciences. There are no records of her ever having participated in the meetings of the Academy. In 1751, the Academy came to refer to her as an honorary rather than a full member, as the statutes confined membership to men.

Popular culture 
Ekeblad was featured in a Google Doodle on 10 July 2017.

See also 
 Elsa Beata Bunge
 Maria Christina Bruhn
 Charlotta Frölich
 De la Gardie
 Timeline of women in science

References

Further reading

External links 
Swedish inventions and discoveries 
Swedish Aristocrat and Agronomist

1724 births
1786 deaths
18th-century Swedish botanists
18th-century Swedish women scientists
Swedish agronomists
18th-century Swedish physicists
Swedish salon-holders
Swedish countesses
Swedish women botanists
Swedish women physicists
Women agronomists
Age of Liberty people
Members of the Royal Swedish Academy of Sciences
Scientists from Stockholm
Swedish people of French descent
De la Gardie family
18th-century agronomists